Tan Qiang (born 16 September 1998) is a Chinese badminton player. In 2015, he won the bronze medal at the Asian Junior Championships in the boys' doubles event partnered with Ren Xiangyu, and in 2016, won the silver medal partnered with He Jiting. In 2017, he became the runner-up at the China International Challenge tournament in the mixed doubles event partnered with Xu Ya.

Achievements

BWF World Championships 
Men's doubles

Asian Junior Championships 
Boys' doubles

BWF World Tour (2 titles, 1 runner-up) 
The BWF World Tour, which was announced on 19 March 2017 and implemented in 2018, is a series of elite badminton tournaments sanctioned by the Badminton World Federation (BWF). The BWF World Tour is divided into levels of World Tour Finals, Super 1000, Super 750, Super 500, Super 300, and the BWF Tour Super 100.

Men's doubles

BWF International Challenge/Series (1 runner-up) 
Mixed doubles

  BWF International Challenge tournament
  BWF International Series tournament
  BWF Future Series tournament

References

External links 
 

1998 births
Living people
Badminton players from Anhui
Chinese male badminton players